Adnan Houjeij (born 3 October 1933) is a Syrian sports shooter. He competed in the mixed trap event at the 1980 Summer Olympics.

References

1933 births
Living people
Syrian male sport shooters
Olympic shooters of Syria
Shooters at the 1980 Summer Olympics
Place of birth missing (living people)